William Barry Ashbee (July 28, 1939 – May 12, 1977) was a Canadian professional ice hockey defenceman who played five seasons in the National Hockey League (NHL) for the Boston Bruins and Philadelphia Flyers between 1965 and 1974. His career ended prematurely due to an eye injury during a game, which partially blinded him. Ashbee later died of leukemia in 1977.

Playing career
Ashbee started his junior hockey with the Barrie Flyers in the Ontario Hockey Association in 1956, although he spent one season with the Lakeshore Bruins in the Metro Junior B Hockey League for further development in 1957–58. He started his professional career by playing eight seasons with the Hershey Bears of the American Hockey League, although he did play 14 games with the Boston Bruins of the NHL during the 1965–66 season. He made his NHL debut on November 25, 1965 against the New York Rangers. Ashbee missed considerable time due to injuries, including the entire 1966–67 season following surgery to fix a crushed disk in his back, and when the NHL expanded in 1967, he was left unprotected for the expansion draft, and subsequently rejoined the minor league Hershey Bears.

He became an NHL regular with the Philadelphia Flyers during the 1970–71 season, and soon became one of their best defensemen. Ashbee was also known as a physical player, and during a game on January 3, 1973 punched a referee after receiving a penalty, and was given an eight-game suspension, the most since Maurice Richard's suspension in 1955. He was named to the NHL Second All-Star team and won a Stanley Cup with the team during the 1973–74 season, and had a +52 plus/minus rating during the regular season. However, his career also ended that year during the playoffs against the New York Rangers.

Eye injury
On April 28, 1974, during overtime of Game 4 of a Stanley Cup semifinal series, a slap shot by Dale Rolfe of the New York Rangers struck Ashbee in the right eye. He was removed from the ice on a stretcher. According to Ashbee's obituary in The New York Times, the vision in his injured eye was permanently reduced to 15 percent. With such limited vision Ashbee was unable to continue playing, so he announced his retirement on June 4, 1975.

Retirement and death
Ashbee became an assistant coach with the team the next season, though he initially declined the job because he thought it was offered to him out of sympathy. In this role, he worked primarily with the team's defencemen. During his first season as an assistant coach, the Flyers won their second straight Stanley Cup. Ashbee had his name added to the Cup for a second time. Ashbee was told that he had leukemia in April 1977. Though it was caught quickly, the cancer spread fast, and Ashbee died on May 12, 1977. He was buried at Glendale Memorial Gardens Cemetery in Weston, Ontario, his hometown.

His jersey number, 4, was retired by the Flyers on October 13, 1977 and the Barry Ashbee Trophy is now awarded each season to the best defenseman for the Flyers.

Career statistics

Regular season and playoffs

Awards and Honors
NHL All-Star Second Team (1974)
Stanley Cup Champions Player (1974), assistant coach (1975)
Number retired by the Philadelphia Flyers (4)

References

Bibliography

External links
 

1939 births
1977 deaths
Barrie Flyers players
Boston Bruins players
Canadian ice hockey coaches
Canadian ice hockey defencemen
Deaths from cancer in Pennsylvania
Deaths from leukemia
Hershey Bears players
Kingston Frontenacs (EPHL) players
National Hockey League players with retired numbers
Philadelphia Flyers coaches
Philadelphia Flyers players
Ice hockey people from Toronto
Stanley Cup champions